Windeby is a municipality in the district of Rendsburg-Eckernförde, in Schleswig-Holstein, Germany. It is situated approximately 2 km west of Eckernförde.

Windeby is part of the Amt ("collective municipality") Windeby. The seat of the Amt is in Eckernförde.

Windeby is east of the municipality of Fleckeby or Osterby, but north of Goosefeld.

Windeby means Wendish village in Danish and indicates a previous Lechite settlement in the village.

References

Rendsburg-Eckernförde